Noor Yussuf Abdulla Taha (born 3 October 2005) is a Bahraini swimmer. She competed in the women's 50 metre freestyle at the 2020 Summer Olympics.

References

External links
 

2005 births
Living people
Bahraini female swimmers
Bahraini female freestyle swimmers
Olympic swimmers of Bahrain
Swimmers at the 2020 Summer Olympics
Place of birth missing (living people)